In the past, Koleolepadidae has been considered a family of barnacles with a single genus, Koleolepas. Research published in 2021 by Chan et al. resulted in Koleolepas being moved to the family Heteralepadidae. The family Koleolepadidae is not longer active.

See also
 Heteralepadidae for the family containing former members of Koleolepadidae.
 List of Cirripedia genera for a list of barnacle families and genera.

References

Obsolete arthropod taxa
Barnacles